Palatsi may refer to:
Jérôme Palatsi, French footballer
Jorge Palatsí, Spanish footballer
Palatsi (opera), opera composed by Aulis Sallinen